The Thirty-Six Dramatic Situations is a descriptive list which was first proposed by Georges Polti in 1895 to categorize every dramatic situation that might occur in a story or performance. Polti analyzed classical Greek texts, plus classical and contemporaneous French works. He also analyzed a handful of non-French authors. In his introduction, Polti claims to be continuing the work of Carlo Gozzi, who also identified 36 situations.

Publication history

This list was published in a book of the same name, which contains extended explanations and examples. The original French-language book was written in 1895. An English translation was published in 1916 and continues to be reprinted.

The list was popularized as an aid for writers, but is also used by dramatists, storytellers and others. Other similar lists have since been made.

It influenced Christina Stead and George Pierce Baker, the author of Dramatic Technique. The 36 situations have been critiqued as being "concatenations of events rather than minimal or isolable motifs".

The 36 situations 
Each situation is stated, then followed by the necessary elements for each situation and a brief description.

 Supplication
 a persecutor; a suppliant; a power in authority, whose decision is doubtful.
 The suppliant appeals to the power in authority for deliverance from the persecutor. The power in authority may be a distinct person or be merely an attribute of the persecutor, e.g. a weapon suspended in their hand. The suppliant may also be two persons, the Persecuted and the Intercessor, an example of which is Esther interceding to the king on behalf of the Jews for deliverance from the king's chief advisor. 
 Deliverance
 an unfortunate; a threatener; a rescuer
 The unfortunate has caused a conflict, and the threatener is to carry out justice, but the rescuer saves the unfortunate. Examples: Ifigenia in Tauride, Deliverance; Superman (1941 film) 
 Crime pursued by vengeance
 a criminal; an avenger
 The criminal commits a crime that will not see justice, so the avenger seeks justice by punishing the criminal. Example: The Count of Monte Cristo
 Vengeance taken for kin upon kin
 Guilty Kinsman; an Avenging Kinsman; remembrance of the Victim, a relative of both. 
 Two entities, the Guilty and the Avenging Kinsmen, are put into conflict over wrongdoing to the Victim, who is allied to both. Example: Hamlet
 Pursuit
 punishment; a fugitive
 the fugitive flees punishment for a misunderstood conflict.  Example: Les Misérables, The Fugitive
 Disaster
 a vanquished power; a victorious enemy or a messenger
 The vanquished power falls from their place after being defeated by the victorious enemy or being informed of such a defeat by the messenger. Example: Agamemnon (play)
 Falling prey to cruelty/misfortune
 an unfortunate; a master or a misfortune
 The unfortunate suffers from misfortune and/or at the hands of the master. Example: Job (biblical figure)
 Revolt
 a tyrant; a conspirator
 The tyrant, a cruel power, is plotted against by the conspirator. Example: Julius Caesar (play)
 Daring enterprise
 a bold leader; an object; an adversary
 The bold leader takes the object from the adversary by overpowering the adversary. Example: Queste del Saint Graal; The Lord of the Rings; Raiders of the Lost Ark
 Abduction
 an abductor; the abducted; a guardian
 The abductor takes the abducted from the guardian. Example: Helen of Troy
 The enigma
 a problem; an interrogator; a seeker
 The interrogator poses a problem to the seeker and gives a seeker better ability to reach the seeker's goals. Example: Oedipus and the Sphinx; The Batman (film)
 Obtaining
 (a Solicitor & an adversary who is refusing) or (an arbitrator & opposing parties)
 The solicitor is at odds with the adversary who refuses to give the solicitor an object in the possession of the adversary, or an arbitrator decides who gets the object desired by opposing parties (the solicitor and the adversary). Example: Apple of Discord
 Enmity of kin
 a Malevolent Kinsman; a Hated or a reciprocally-hating Kinsman
 The Malevolent Kinsman and the Hated or a second Malevolent Kinsman conspire together. Example: As You Like It
 Rivalry of kin
 the Preferred Kinsman; the Rejected Kinsman; the Object of Rivalry
 The Object of Rivalry chooses the Preferred Kinsman over the Rejected Kinsman. Example: Wuthering Heights
 Murderous adultery
 two Adulterers; a Betrayed Spouse
 Two Adulterers conspire to kill the Betrayed Spouse. Example: Clytemnestra, Aegisthus, Double Indemnity
 Madness
 a Madman; a Victim
 The Madman goes insane and wrongs the Victim. Example: The Shining (novel)
 Fatal imprudence
 the Imprudent; a Victim or an Object Lost
 The Imprudent, by neglect or ignorance, loses the Object Lost or wrongs the Victim. Example: Kris Kelvin and his wife in Solaris (1972 film)
 Involuntary crimes of love
 a Lover; a Beloved; a Revealer
 The Lover and the Beloved have unknowingly broken a taboo through their romantic relationship, and the Revealer reveals this to them.  Example: Oedipus, Jocasta and the messenger from Corinth. 
 Slaying of kin unrecognized
 the Slayer; an Unrecognized Victim
 The Slayer kills the Unrecognized Victim. Example: Oedipus and Laius
 Self-sacrifice for an ideal
 a Hero; an Ideal; a Creditor or a Person/Thing sacrificed
 The Hero sacrifices the Person or Thing for their Ideal, which is then taken by the Creditor. Example: The gospel
 Self-sacrifice for kin
 a Hero; a Kinsman; a Creditor or a Person/Thing sacrificed
 The Hero sacrifices a Person or Thing for their Kinsman, which is then taken by the Creditor. Example: The gospel
 All sacrificed for passion
 a Lover; an Object of fatal Passion; the Person/Thing sacrificed
 A Lover sacrifices a Person or Thing for the Object of their Passion, which is then lost forever. Example: Breaking Bad (2008 television show)
 Necessity of sacrificing loved ones
 a Hero; a Beloved Victim; the Necessity for the Sacrifice
 The Hero wrongs the Beloved Victim because of the Necessity for their Sacrifice. Example: Binding of Isaac
 Rivalry of superior vs. inferior
 a Superior Rival; an Inferior Rival; the Object of Rivalry
 An Inferior Rival bests a Superior Rival and wins the Object of Rivalry. Example: Godzilla vs. Kong
 Adultery
 two Adulterers; a Deceived Spouse
 Two Adulterers conspire against the Deceived Spouse. Brothers (2009 film)
 Crimes of love
 a Lover; the Beloved
 A Lover and the Beloved break a taboo by initiating a romantic relationship Example: Sigmund and his sister in The Valkyrie
 Discovery of the dishonour of a loved one
 a Discoverer; the Guilty One
 The Discoverer discovers the wrongdoing committed by the Guilty One.
 Obstacles to love
 two Lovers; an Obstacle
 Two Lovers face an Obstacle together. Example: Romeo and Juliet
 An enemy loved
 a Lover; the Beloved Enemy; the Hater
 The allied Lover and Hater have diametrically opposed attitudes towards the Beloved Enemy.
 Ambition
 an Ambitious Person; a Thing Coveted; an Adversary
 The Ambitious Person seeks the Thing Coveted and is opposed by the Adversary. Example: Macbeth
 Conflict with a god
 a Mortal; an Immortal
 The Mortal and the Immortal enter a conflict. Example: Jacob wrestling with the angel
 Mistaken jealousy
 a Jealous One; an Object of whose Possession He is Jealous; a Supposed Accomplice; a Cause or an Author of the Mistake
 The Jealous One falls victim to the Cause or the Author of the Mistake and becomes jealous of the Object and becomes conflicted with the Supposed Accomplice.
 Erroneous judgment
 a Mistaken One; a Victim of the Mistake; a Cause or Author of the Mistake; the Guilty One
 The Mistaken One falls victim to the Cause or the Author of the Mistake and passes judgment against the Victim of the Mistake when it should be passed against the Guilty One instead.
 Remorse
 a Culprit; a Victim or the Sin; an Interrogator
 The Culprit wrongs the Victim or commits the Sin, and is at odds with the Interrogator who seeks to understand the situation. Example: No Exit: The Bourne Supremacy
 Recovery of a lost one
 a Seeker; the One Found
 The Seeker finds the One Found. Example: A Very Long Engagement, Finding Nemo
 Loss of loved ones
 a Kinsman Slain; a Kinsman Spectator; an Executioner
 The killing of the Kinsman Slain by the Executioner is witnessed by the Kinsman. Example: Braveheart, Gladiator (2000 film)

See also
 Aarne–Thompson classification systems
 Morphology (folkloristics)
 The Golden Bough
 The Seven Basic Plots
 Vladimir Propp

References

External links
 Full text available at Internet Archive
 Full text available at Wikisource

Drama
Narratology
1916 books